{{DISPLAYTITLE:C17H13N5O2}}
The molecular formula C17H13N5O2 (molar mass: 319.317 g/mol, exact mass: 319.1069 u) may refer to:

 Nitrazolam
 SB-334867

Molecular formulas